Henry Bryce Jordan (September 22, 1924 – April 12, 2016) was an American university administrator and musicologist. He was the fourteenth president of the Pennsylvania State University, serving from 1983 until 1990. Prior to that, he served as interim president of the University of Texas at Austin from 1970 to 1971 and as first president of the University of Texas at Dallas from 1971 to 1982.

During Jordan's tenure at Penn State, the university became the 11th member of the Big Ten Conference in 1990. Penn State's Bryce Jordan Center is named after him. He died on April 12, 2016.

References

External links
  Bryce Jordan, The Jordan Medallion
 The Jordan Years: A Personal Retrospective
 Bryce Jordan, libraries.psu.edu

1924 births
2016 deaths
Presidents of the University of Texas at Austin
Presidents of Pennsylvania State University
Presidents of the University of Texas at Dallas
People from Clovis, New Mexico